Julius Léopold Eduard Avé-Lallemant (4 July 1803 – 17 May 1867) was a German botanist who was a native of Lübeck.

From 1838 to 1855 he performed his scientific work in St. Petersburg. Botanists Friedrich Ernst Ludwig von Fischer (1782–1854) and Carl Anton von Meyer (1795–1855) named the plant genus Lallemantia from the family Lamiaceae in his honor. Avé-Lallemant was the author of De plantis quibusdam Italiae borealis et Germaniae australis rarioribus (1829). He was also an entomologist.

References

 This article is based on a translation of an equivalent article at the German Wikipedia, source listed as: Robert Zander, Fritz Encke, Günther Buchheim, Siegmund Seybold (eds.): Handbook of Plant Names . 13th Edition. Ulmer Verlag, Stuttgart 1984, .

External links 
 IPNI List of plants described and co-described by  Avé-Lallemant.

German entomologists
German taxonomists
1803 births
1867 deaths
19th-century German botanists
19th-century German zoologists
Scientists from Lübeck
German people of French descent